Marcel More (born 13 September 1975) is a Slovenian taekwondo practitioner. He competed in the men's 80 kg event at the 2000 Summer Olympics.

References

1975 births
Living people
Slovenian male taekwondo practitioners
Olympic taekwondo practitioners of Slovenia
Taekwondo practitioners at the 2000 Summer Olympics
Sportspeople from Ljubljana